Jezero is a village east of Trebnje in eastern Slovenia in the Municipality of Trebnje. The area is part of the historical region of Lower Carniola. The municipality is now included in the Southeast Slovenia Statistical Region.

Church
The local church is dedicated to Saint Peter and belongs to the Parish of Trebnje. It dates to at least the 14th century and contains traces of 15th-century frescos.

References

External links
Jezero at Geopedia

Populated places in the Municipality of Trebnje